Darren Joseph is the running backs coach for the Ottawa Gee-Gees of U Sports football. He is also a former professional Canadian football running back and fullback who played from 1992 to 2004 in the Canadian Football League (CFL) with the Ottawa Rough Riders, Saskatchewan Roughriders, Toronto Argonauts, Montreal Alouettes, Ottawa Renegades and BC Lions.

Amateur career
He played in the Canadian Junior Football League for the Ottawa Sooners from 1988 to 1990 and then CIAU football for the Ottawa Gee-Gees from 1991 to 1992.

Professional career

Ottawa Rough Riders
Joseph first signed with his hometown Ottawa Rough Riders in January 1992 and had 119 carries for 711 yards and two touchdowns in his rookie season. He also had 15 receptions for 113 yards and a 10-yard touchdown pass in 1992. His production fell in 1993 as he rushed for 398 yards on 108 attempts, but had a career high in receiving yards with 403 from 33 catches. In his last year with the Rough Riders, in 1994, he had 68 carries for 280 yards and 18 catches for 185 yards.

Saskatchewan Roughriders
On June 25, 1995, Joseph was traded to the Saskatchewan Roughriders in exchange for Chris Burns. He played for four seasons with the Roughriders and shifted more to fullback and special teams coverage as he had a career-high 19 special teams tackles in 1997. He also played in his first Grey Cup game that year where he had one special teams tackle, but the team lost the 85th Grey Cup to the Toronto Argonauts.

Toronto Argonauts
As a free agent, Joseph signed with the Toronto Argonauts on March 1, 1999. He played in 22 regular season games over two seasons with the Argonauts where he had 37 carries for 193 rushing yards and two touchdowns and 16 special teams tackles. He was released by the Argonauts on August 18, 2000.

Montreal Alouettes
Soon after his Toronto departure, Joseph was signed by the Montreal Alouettes on August 22, 2000. He played in nine regular season games for the team and had 11 special teams tackles.

Toronto Argonauts
Joseph re-signed with the Toronto Argonauts for the 2001 season and played in 17 regular season games where he had nine carries for 25 yards and a touchdown along with nine special teams tackles.

Ottawa Renegades
In 2002, Joseph joined the expansion Ottawa Renegades where he played in 11 regular season games and had four catches for 37 yards and a touchdown in addition to 11 special teams tackles. During the 2003 season, he matched a CFL record when he recorded seven special teams tackles in a single game on October 13, 2003.

BC Lions
Joseph signed with the BC Lions in 2004 and played in five regular season games where he had six special teams tackles. He also played in the 92nd Grey Cup where he recorded three special teams tackles, but the Lions lost the game to the Toronto Argonauts.

For his playing career, Joseph played in 175 regular season games and ran for 2,412 yards on 526 attempts, scoring 15 rushing touchdowns. He also caught 103 passes for 1,175 yards and four receiving touchdowns. While playing on special teams, he recorded 122 special teams tackles.

Coaching career
After working as a police officer following his playing career, Joseph became the running backs coach for the Ottawa Gee-Gees in 2021.

References

External links
 Ottawa Gee-Gees bio

1968 births
Living people
Canadian football running backs
Canadian Junior Football League players
Ottawa Gee-Gees football players
Ottawa Gee-Gees football coaches
Ottawa Rough Riders players
Saskatchewan Roughriders players
Toronto Argonauts players
Montreal Alouettes players
Ottawa Renegades players
BC Lions players
Canadian football people from Ottawa
Players of Canadian football from Ontario
Coaches of Canadian football